Jan Eric Friese (born 1 August 1999) is a German swimmer. He competed in the men's 4 × 100 metre freestyle relay at the 2020 Summer Olympics.

References

External links

1999 births
Living people
German male swimmers
German male freestyle swimmers
Olympic swimmers of Germany
Swimmers at the 2020 Summer Olympics
Florida Gators men's swimmers
Sportspeople from Potsdam
20th-century German people
21st-century German people